Jad Saxton (born September 27) is an American voice actress and ADR Director who works for Funimation and Sentai Filmworks.

Early life 
Her name is an acronym of her parents' names, Jimmi and David, and is pronounced "Jayd". She grew up with a good singing voice, which eventually led to her first voice role in Sasami: Magical Girls Club as Eimi Mori, and her first major voice role was Masako Hara in Ghost Hunt. She graduated summa cum laude from Texas Wesleyan University with a Bachelor of Arts in Music in 2005.

Filmography

Anime

Films

Video games

References

External links
 Official agency profile
  
 
 

Living people
American video game actresses
American voice actresses
Texas Wesleyan University alumni
21st-century American actresses
American stage actresses
American voice directors
Year of birth missing (living people)